Foguinho may refer to:

 Humberto Foguinho (born 1978), born Humberto Daniel Soares Martelo, Brazilian football midfielder
 Renan Foguinho (born 1989), born Renan Rodrigues da Silva, Brazilian football defensive midfielder
 Foguinho (footballer, born 1992), born Guilherme Seefeldt Krolow, Brazilian football midfielder
 Foguinho (footballer, born 2000), born Vinicius Xavier da Purificação Moutinho, Brazilian football attacking midfielder